Far Eastern College – Silang, more known as FEU Cavite, is a private nonsectarian basic and higher education  institution located in MetroGate Silang Estates, Silang, Cavite, a municipality  south of Manila, Philippines. Established in 2009, it is the first subsidiary of the Far Eastern University (FEU) outside of Metro Manila.

In 2010, FEU Cavite opened its doors to Kindergarten, Basic Education (Elementary to High School) and Higher Education; while in June 2016, its Senior High School. The college offers a range of programs such as Accountancy, Business Management, Information Technology, Psychology, and Hospitality Management. It operates as an extension campus of FEU Manila.

History
In January 2009, a ground-breaking ceremony marked the start of the construction of the FEU Cavite campus in MetroGate Silang Estates, an exclusive subdivision. Finished in 2010, it have two environment-friendly buildings, one for the Basic Education Department and the other for the Higher Education Department. The campus stands in six-hectare parcel of land. 

In 2020, FEU Manila extended the school's program offerings with three undergraduate programs, two graduate programs, and a teacher certification program.

Academics

Basic Education 

 Pre-school
 Grade school
 Junior high school

Senior High School 

 Academic track
 STEM (science, technology, engineering and mathematics)
 HUMSS (humanities and social sciences)
 ABM (accountancy, business and management)

Higher Education 

 Bachelor of Science in Psychology
 Bachelor of Science in Accountancy
 Bachelor of Science in Accounting Information Systems
 Bachelor of Science Business Administration
 Financial Management track
 Marketing Management track
 Bachelor of Science Information Technology
 Bachelor of Science in Hospitality Management 
 Culinary Management track
 Hotel Operations track
 Bachelor of Science in Hospitality management 
 Events Management track
 Travel and Tours Management track

Extension programs 
 Bachelor of Arts in Political Science 
 Philippine Politics and Foreign Relations track
 Bachelor of Arts in Communication
 Convergent Media track
 Digital Cinema track
 Bachelor of Science in Medical Technology
 Master of Arts in Psychology
 Master in Business Administration
 Teacher Certificate Program

Campus

Academic buildings
The FEU Cavite campus is unique for its structure and location. Aside from being inside an exclusive subdivision, its academic buildings are built on two separate locations, approximately 900 meters apart. The Basic Education and Senior High School Building is located near the subdivision's center while the Higher Education Building is near the subdivision's secondary entrance. 

Designed by Archion Architects, high ceilings and large windows were incorporated into the architecture, allowing as much air and light inside as possible and to minimize the use of air-conditioning. Both buildings feature metal sunshades, design created by local artists, the couple Mona and Soler Santos.

In 2018, the four-story Basic Education Building has been upgraded due to the lack of classrooms to accommodate the Senior High School students. A new floor with five classrooms, two laboratories, and an administrative office has been added. In 2020, the building was honored at the National Commission for Culture and the Arts Haligi ng Dangal Awards as the People's Choice after garnering votes from the public through online Facebook voting.

Dormitory
FEU Cavite has its own dormitory, known as TAM-Bahay. It broke ground in November 2014 and was opened in June 2015. It stands on a  piece of land adjacent to the Higher Education building. It has three floors and can accommodate 120 people. It also has a room for two persons with disabilities.

Community 
Since the school is located inside a private village, free shuttle services have been introduced to ease the students' commute. There are shuttles serving the town proper of Silang and the main gate of the subdivision where the campus stands.

In 2015, the official student publication of the college, Simbuhan, was launched.

References

External links
FEU Cavite
Far Eastern University

Far Eastern University
Universities and colleges in Cavite
Education in Silang, Cavite